The Lion's Mouse is a 1923 British-Dutch silent crime film directed by Oscar Apfel.

Cast
 Wyndham Standing as Dick Sands
 Mary Odette as Mouse
 Rex Davis as Justin O'Reilly
 Marguerite Marsh as Olga Beverley
 Carl Tobi as Stephen
  as murderer
 Willem van der Veer
 Roy Travers
 Cor Smits

References

External links 
 

1923 films
British silent feature films
Dutch silent feature films
British black-and-white films
Dutch black-and-white films
1923 crime films
Films directed by Oscar Apfel
Films based on British novels
Dutch crime films
Films based on works by Alice Williamson